Heartland Town Centre is an outdoor shopping centre located in Mississauga, Ontario, Canada. Heartland Town Centre occupies  of space and has 180 stores, making it is one of Canada's largest malls.

Heartland Town Centre is owned and managed by Canadian-based Orlando Corporation. The centre's slogan is "Everything you need is here".

Location 
The Heartland Town Centre is centred on all four corners of the Mavis and Britannia Road intersection, reaching north to Highway 401 and south to Matheson Boulevard. Nearby population centres include Brampton, Oakville and Toronto.

Description 
Heartland Town Centre offers a variety of retailers, services and restaurants. The major stores are spread around two blocks and have independent parking lots.  Retailers include Nordstrom Rack, Sephora, Ashley HomeStore, Best Buy, Banana Republic, Costco, Dollarama, H&M, HomeSense, JYSK, Harry Rosen Outlet, Loblaws, Marshalls, Michaels, Moores, Old Navy, Party City, Petsmart, The Brick, Seafood City, Staples, Tommy Hilfiger, Walmart and Winners.

References

Buildings and structures in Mississauga
Shopping malls in the Regional Municipality of Peel
Power centres (retail) in Canada